The Embassy of Brazil is Brazil's embassy in Canada. It is located at 450 Wilbrod Street in Ottawa, Ontario, Canada. Denis Fontes de Souza Pinto serves as Ambassador (as of February 2017).

Brazil also operates consulate offices in Montreal, Toronto, and Vancouver.

External links
Embassy of Brazil - Ottawa
Consultate General of Brazil in Montreal
Consultate General of Brazil in Toronto
Consulate General of Brazil in Vancouver
Foreign Affairs and International Trade Canada: Order of Precedence (diplomatic protocol)

Brazil
Ottawa
Brazil–Canada relations